Jürgen Kuresoo (born 11 February 1987, in Elva) is an Estonian footballer and football coach, playing for FC Elva in Estonian Esiliiga. He plays the position of forward and is 1.76 m tall. He has also worked as Elva's youth coach and assistant coach. In his earlier career, he played as a midfielder.

Club career
Having previously played for Sillamäe Kalev and Flora, he joined FC Elva in 2010, while team was in III liiga. Kuresoo scored his 100th goal for the club on 5 October 2014 after which he expressed his desire to remain in the club until the end of his career. The club was promoted to Esiliiga in 2017.

International career
On 15 November 2005, Kuresoo made the first team debut as a substitute in a 3–1 defeat against Poland.

Honours

Individual
Esiliiga B Player of the Year: 2015, 2016

References

External links
 
 
 

1987 births
Living people
People from Elva, Estonia
JK Maag Tartu players
FC Flora players
JK Tervis Pärnu players
JK Sillamäe Kalev players
Viljandi JK Tulevik players
Estonian footballers
Estonia international footballers
Association football midfielders
Association football forwards
FC Elva players
Estonian football managers